Thicker Than Blood may refer to:

 "Thicker Than Blood" (song), a 2002 single by Garth Brooks
 Thicker Than Blood (film), a 1998 film starring Mickey Rourke 
 Thicker Than Blood: The Larry McLinden Story, a 1994 film starring Peter Strauss